The nuclear-cytoplasmic ratio (also variously known as the nucleus:cytoplasm ratio, nucleus-cytoplasm ratio, N:C ratio, or N/C) is a measurement used in cell biology.  It is a ratio of the size (i.e., volume) of the nucleus of a cell to the size of the cytoplasm of that cell.

The N:C ratio indicates the maturity of a cell, because as a cell matures the size of its nucleus generally decreases. For example, "blast" forms of erythrocytes, leukocytes, and megakaryocytes start with an N:C ratio of 4:1, which decreases as they mature to 2:1 or even 1:1 (with exceptions for mature thrombocytes and erythrocytes, which are anuclear cells, and mature lymphocytes, which only decrease to a 3:1 ratio and often retain the original 4:1 ratio).

An increased N:C ratio is commonly associated with precancerous dysplasia as well as with malignant cells.

See also

Cytopathology
Nuclear atypia
Nuclear pleomorphism

References

Further reading 

 
 
 

Histology